Temnadenia  is a genus of flowering plants in the family Apocynaceae, first described as a genus in 1878. It is native to South America.

Species
 Temnadenia odorifera (Vell.) J.F.Morales - Brazil
 Temnadenia ornata (Hoehne) Woodson - Bolivia, Peru, W Brazil
 Temnadenia stenantha Woodson - Boyacá region of Colombia
 Temnadenia violacea (Vell.) Miers - Brazil

formerly included
 Temnadenia annularis = Prestonia annularis  
 Temnadenia cordata  = Mandevilla oaxacana  
 Temnadenia corrugulata = Prestonia solanifolia  
 Temnadenia glaucescens = Mandevilla oaxacana  
 Temnadenia lasiocarpa = Mandevilla hirsuta  
 Temnadenia leptoloba  = Prestonia quinquangularis 
 Temnadenia lobbiana = Mandevilla hirsuta  
 Temnadenia meyeri = Macropharynx meyeri  
 Temnadenia palustris = Mandevilla hirsuta  
 Temnadenia parviflora  = Prestonia parviflora  
 Temnadenia quinquangularis  = Prestonia quinquangularis 
 Temnadenia riedelii = Prestonia riedelii  
 Temnadenia secundiflora = Mandevilla subsagittata  
 Temnadenia semidigyna = Echites semidigynus  
 Temnadenia solanifolia = Prestonia solanifolia  
 Temnadenia tenuicula = Prestonia solanifolia  
 Temnadenia tomentosa = Mandevilla hirsuta  
 Temnadenia xanthostoma = Mandevilla coccinea

References

Apocynaceae genera
Echiteae